Genoa C.F.C. had a mixed season, in which it struggled to replace world-class striker Diego Milito, who moved on to Internazionale, where he was key in winning the treble in 2010. Such a player was difficult to find, and his Argentinian replacements Hernán Crespo and Rodrigo Palacio lacked the final punch. Crespo had it in his younger years, of course, but despite four goals in the autumn, he was offloaded to Parma, as Genoa put its faith in David Suazo for the goalscoring. Sergio Floccari also departed, and the Lazio signing scored more goals for the Roman club in half the year than what any player did for Genoa the whole season, while Suazo became a flop. The defence did not perform at expected level either, and even though the team scored several goals by many players, the defensive holes ensured the team did not repeat the fifth position from the year before.

Squad

Goalkeepers
  Alberto Frison
  Marco Amelia
  Alessio Scarpi

Defenders
  Giuseppe Biava
  Dario Dainelli
  Domenico Criscito
  Ivan Fatić
  Sokratis Papastathopoulos
  Emiliano Moretti
  Salvatore Bocchetti
  Nenad Tomović
  Andrea Esposito

Midfielders
  Houssine Kharja
  Marco Rossi
  Giandomenico Mesto
  Alberto Zapater
  Robert Gucher
  Ivan Jurić
  Omar Milanetto
  Silvano Raggio Garibaldi
  Francesco Modesto
  Matteo Paro

Forwards
  Rodrigo Palacio
  Robert Acquafresca
  Raffaele Palladino
  Stephan El Shaarawy
  Giuseppe Sculli
  Boško Janković
  David Suazo
  Sergio Floccari
  Hernán Crespo
  Luciano Figueroa
  Richmond Boakye

Serie A

League table

Matches
 Genoa-Roma 3–2
 1–0 Domenico Criscito (49)
 1–1 Rodrigo Taddei (54)
 1–2 Francesco Totti (64)
 2–2 Alberto Zapater (69)
 3–2 Giuseppe Biava (83)
 Atalanta-Genoa 0–1
 0–1 Emiliano Moretti (45 + 1)
 Genoa-Napoli 4–1
 0–1 Marek Hamšík (41)
 1–1 Sergio Floccari (45 + 6 (pen.))
 2–1 Giandomenico Mesto (55)
 3–1 Hernán Crespo (75)
 4–1 Houssine Kharja (88)
 Chievo-Genoa 3–1
 1–0 Michele Marcolini (5 (pen.))
 2–0 Erjon Bogdani (7)
 2–1 Sergio Floccari (65 (pen.))
 3–1 Sergio Pellissier (76)
 Genoa-Juventus 2–2
 0–1 Vincenzo Iaquinta (6)
 1–1 Giandomenico Mesto (31)
 2–1 Hernán Crespo (75)
 2–2 David Trezeguet (86)
 Udinese-Genoa 2–0
 1–0 Antonio Di Natale (81)
 2–0 Simone Pepe (88)
 Bologna-Genoa 1–3
 0–1 Houssine Kharja (11 (pen.))
 0–2 Giuseppe Sculli (35)
 1–2 Marco Di Vaio (85 (pen.))
 1–3 Alberto Zapater (90)
 Genoa-Internazionale 0–5
 0–1 Esteban Cambiasso (6)
 0–2 Mario Balotelli (31)
 0–3 Dejan Stanković (45 + 4)
 0–4 Patrick Vieira (66)
 0–5 Maicon (71)
 Cagliari-Genoa 3–2
 0–1 Giandomenico Mesto (20)
 1–1 Davide Biondini (55)
 1–2 Sergio Floccari (55)
 2–2 Nenê (78 pen)
 3–2 Andrea Lazzari (87)
 Genoa-Fiorentina 2–1
 1–0 Raffaele Palladino (43)
 1–1 Marco Marchionni (63)
 2–1 Giandomenico Mesto (73)
 Palermo-Genoa 0–0
 Genoa-Siena 4–2
 1–0 Hernán Crespo (2)
 2–0 Hernán Crespo (17)
 3–0 Raffaele Palladino (34)
 3–1 Michele Paolucci (80)
 3–2 Massimo Maccarone (82)
 4–2 Sergio Floccari (90)
 Livorno-Genoa 2–1
 1–0 Cristiano Lucarelli (21)
 1–1 Domenico Criscito (62)
 2–1 Nico Pulzetti (90 + 2)
 Genoa-Sampdoria 3–0
 1–0 Omar Milanetto (10 (pen.))
 2–0 Marco Rossi (53)
 3–0 Raffaele Palladino (75)
 Genoa-Parma 2–2
 1–0 Rodrigo Palacio (14)
 1–1 Jonathan Biabiany (36)
 1–2 Jonathan Biabiany (59)
 2–2 Raffaele Palladino (67)
 Lazio-Genoa 1–0
 1–0 Aleksandar Kolarov (39)
 Genoa-Bari 1–1
 0–1 Barreto (4)
 1–1 Omar Milanetto (52)
 Milan-Genoa 5–2
 0–1 Giuseppe Sculli (25)
 1–1 Ronaldinho (32 (pen.))
 2–1 Thiago Silva (38)
 3–1 Marco Borriello (48)
 4–1 Marco Borriello (60)
 5–1 Klaas-Jan Huntelaar (74 (pen.))
 5–2 David Suazo (79)
 Genoa-Catania 2–0
 1–0 Giandomenico Mesto (36)
 2–0 Giuseppe Sculli (71)
 Roma-Genoa 3–0
 1–0 Simone Perrotta (17)
 2–0 Luca Toni (45)
 3–0 Luca Toni (60)
 Genoa-Atalanta 2–0
 1–0 Rodrigo Palacio (18)
 2–0 Hernán Crespo (42)
 Napoli-Genoa 0–0
 Genoa-Chievo 1–0
 1–0 Marco Rossi (63)
 Juventus-Genoa 3–2
 0–1 Marco Rossi (16)
 1–1 Amauri (42)
 2–1 Alessandro Del Piero (61)
 2–2 Marco Rossi (63)
 3–2 Alessandro Del Piero (78 (pen.))
 Genoa-Udinese 3–0
 1–0 Robert Acquafresca (30)
 2–0 Robert Acquafresca (53 (pen.))
 3–0 Rodrigo Palacio (64)
 Genoa-Bologna 3–4
 1–0 David Suazo (8)
 1–1 Antonio Buscè (11)
 2–1 Giuseppe Sculli (18)
 2–2 Adaílton (28)
 3–2 David Suazo (38)
 3–3 Adaílton (56)
 3–4 Adaílton (79 (pen.))
 Internazionale-Genoa 0–0
 Genoa-Cagliari 5–3
 0–1 Daniele Dessena (16)
 1–1 Alberto Zapater (36 (pen.))
 2–1 Rodrigo Palacio (39)
 2–2 Daniele Conti (41)
 3–2 Giuseppe Sculli (42)
 4–2 Marco Rossi (45)
 4–3 Alessandro Matri (55 (pen.))
 5–3 Omar Milanetto (59)
 Fiorentina-Genoa 3–0
 1–0 Mario Santana (4)
 2–0 Alberto Gilardino (73 (pen.))
 3–0 Khouma Babacar (86)
 Genoa-Palermo 2–2
 0–1 Abel Hernández (35)
 1–1 Salvatore Bocchetti (75)
 1–2 Javier Pastore (78)
 2–2 Houssine Kharja (90 + 8 (pen.))
 Siena-Genoa 0–0
 Genoa-Livorno 1–1
 1–0 Richmond Boakye (51)
 1–1 Francesco Tavano (88)
 Sampdoria-Genoa 1–0
 1–0 Antonio Cassano (23)
 Parma-Genoa 2–3
 0–1 Rodrigo Palacio (33)
 0–2 Rodrigo Palacio (51)
 1–2 Cristian Zaccardo (59)
 2–2 Salvatore Bocchetti (62 (o.g.))
 2–3 Ivan Fatić (72)
 Genoa-Lazio 1–2
 1–0 Rodrigo Palacio (8)
 1–1 André Dias (25)
 1–2 Sergio Floccari (32)
 Bari-Genoa 3–0
 1–0 Riccardo Meggiorini (57)
 2–0 José Ignacio Castillo (85)
 3–0 Barreto (89)
 Genoa-Milan 1–0
 1–0 Giuseppe Sculli (57)
 Catania-Genoa 1–0
 1–0 Maxi López (65)

Topscorers
  Rodrigo Palacio – 7
  Marco Rossi – 5
  Hernán Crespo – 5
  Raffaele Palladino – 4
  Sergio Floccari – 4

External links
2009–10 Genoa C.F.C. season at ESPN

Genoa C.F.C. seasons
Genoa